Hopea scabra is a species of plant in the family Dipterocarpaceae. It is endemic to Papua New Guinea.

References

scabra
Trees of Papua New Guinea
Data deficient plants
Taxonomy articles created by Polbot